The 1981 Western Kentucky Hilltoppers football team represented Western Kentucky University as a member of the Ohio Valley Conference during the 1981 NCAA Division I-AA football season. Led by 14th-year head coach Jimmy Feix, the Hilltoppers compiled an overall record of 6–5 with a mark of 4–4 on conference play, tying for fourth in the OVC. The team's captains were Greg Gallas, Troy Snardon, Lamont Meacham.

Schedule

References

Western Kentucky
Western Kentucky Hilltoppers football seasons
{Western Kentucky Hilltoppers football